Edward Santeliz (born June 18, 1987 in Mazatenango, Suchitepéquez) is a Guatemalan footballer currently playing for Xelajú MC in the Liga Nacional de Fútbol de Guatemala.

Career

Club
Santeliz grew up in the suburb of Glendale Heights where he played for Sockers FC Chicago and starred on his high school team, the Glenbard East Rams, where he earned all-state accolades.

Santeliz left his native Chicago when he was 18 years old to join Suchitepéquez, where he quickly made a name for himself in his five years with the club.

Santeliz was signed by USSF Division 2 club Miami FC in March 2010. After the season, he signed with Major Indoor Soccer League side Chicago Riot and played 11 games before being released to return to Suchitepéquez. Santeliz played for 	Comunicaciones in the 2013/2014 season and recently transferred to club Xelajú MC in 2014

International
Santeliz's strong performances for Suchitepéquez earned him a spot on the Guatemalan Under-20 team that played in the qualifying tournament for the 2007 FIFA U-20 World Cup held in Canada.

International goals
Scores and results list Guatemala's goal tally first.

References

External links
Miami FC bio

Living people
1987 births
Guatemalan footballers
C.D. Suchitepéquez players
Miami FC (2006) players
USSF Division 2 Professional League players
C.D. Malacateco players
Guatemala international footballers
Soccer players from Illinois
2013 Copa Centroamericana players
People from Suchitepéquez Department
Association football forwards